Antonio Pacheco is a Puerto Rican soccer player who plays professionally in Puerto Rico for Guaynabo Fluminense.  He has also played internationally for the Puerto Rico national football team and Puerto Rico Under-20 team.

References

Living people
Puerto Rican footballers
Sevilla FC Puerto Rico players
USL Championship players
Association football forwards
Year of birth missing (living people)